Centenary Square, formerly known as Bicentennial Square, is a civic square located in the heart of Parramatta, New South Wales, Australia. It faces the 1883 Parramatta Town Hall and St John's Cathedral. The square was listed on the Parramatta City Council local government heritage list on 20 August 1999.

Features and history
To celebrate the colony's centenary, in 1888 the Parramatta Borough Council erected, at a cost of A£600, the Centennial Memorial, a Victorian Free Classically-styled elaborate clock and drinking fountain.

To mark the opening of the Church Street Mall in 1986 and the closure of through traffic on Church Street, a time capsule was buried under one of the square's gardens by Janice Crosio MP, NSW Minister for Water Resources. In order to mark the Australian Bicentenary in 1988, the Parramatta City Council commissioned the sculpture, Procession, by artist Richard Goodwin.

The Parramatta City Council reverted the square's name to Centenary Square on 24 September 2014.

The commercial buildings surrounding the square are mainly two-storeyed, with one of the Murray Buildings (alongside the Town Hall and farthest from St Johns) are three storeys. Murray Brothers erected the town's first department store in 1926; and other major stores soon followed. This was also the site where Rev. Samuel Marsden once lived. Outside St John's Cathedral stands a memorial to those who served in World War I. This takes the form of a stone arch and plaques; and was erected in 1917.

The square serves as the eastern terminus of the proposed  Great West Walk connecting Parramatta and  via the Western Sydney Parklands.

See also

 List of parks in Sydney
 History of New South Wales

References

External links

 
 

Parks in Sydney
Buildings and structures in Parramatta
Australian bicentennial commemorations
1888 in Australia